Henckelia is a genus of flowering plants in the family Gesneriaceae. Many of its species were formerly placed in Didymocarpus sect. Orthoboea and in the genus Chirita. Many species formerly placed in Henckelia have been moved to Codonoboea and Loxocarpus.

Species
Species include:
Henckelia adenocalyx (Chatterjee) D.J.Middleton & Mich.Möller
Henckelia anachoreta (Hance) D.J.Middleton & Mich.Möller
Henckelia angusta (C.B.Clarke) D.J.Middleton & Mich.Möller
Henckelia auriculata (J.M.Li & S.X.Zhu) D.J.Middleton & Mich.Möller
Henckelia bifolia (D.Don) A.Dietr.
Henckelia briggsioides (W.T.Wang) D.J.Middleton & Mich.Möller
Henckelia burttii D.J.Middleton & Mich.Möller
Henckelia calva (C.B.Clarke) D.J.Middleton & Mich.Möller
Henckelia ceratoscyphus (B.L.Burtt) D.J.Middleton & Mich.Möller
Henckelia communis (Gardner) D.J.Middleton & Mich.Möller
Henckelia dibangensis (B.L.Burtt, S.K.Srivast. & Mehrotra) D.J.Middleton & Mich.Möller
Henckelia dielsii (Borza) D.J.Middleton & Mich.Möller
Henckelia dimidiata (Wall. ex C.B.Clarke) D.J.Middleton & Mich.Möller
Henckelia fasciculiflora (W.T.Wang) D.J.Middleton & Mich.Möller
Henckelia fischeri (Gamble) A.Weber & B.L.Burtt
Henckelia floccosa (Thwaites) A.Weber & B.L.Burtt
Henckelia forrestii (J.Anthony) D.J.Middleton & Mich.Möller
Henckelia fruticola (H.W.Li) D.J.Middleton & Mich.Möller
Henckelia gambleana (C.E.C.Fisch.) A.Weber & B.L.Burtt
Henckelia grandifolia A.Dietr.
Henckelia heterostigma (B.L.Burtt) D.J.Middleton & Mich.Möller
Henckelia humboldtiana (Gardner) A.Weber & B.L.Burtt
Henckelia incana (Vahl) Spreng.
Henckelia infundibuliformis (W.T.Wang) D.J.Middleton & Mich.Möller
Henckelia innominata (B.L.Burtt) A.Weber & B.L.Burtt
Henckelia insignis (C.B.Clarke) D.J.Middleton & Mich.Möller
Henckelia lacei (W.W.Sm.) D.J.Middleton & Mich.Möller
Henckelia lachenensis (C.B.Clarke) D.J.Middleton & Mich.Möller
Henckelia longipedicellata (B.L.Burtt) D.J.Middleton & Mich.Möller
Henckelia longisepala (H.W.Li) D.J.Middleton & Mich.Möller
Henckelia lyrata (Wight) A.Weber & B.L.Burtt
Henckelia macrostachya (E.Barnes) A.Weber & B.L.Burtt
Henckelia meeboldii (W.W.Sm. & Ramaswami) A.Weber & B.L.Burtt
Henckelia mishmiensis (Debb. ex Biswas) D.J.Middleton & Mich.Möller
Henckelia missionis (Wall. ex R.Br.) A.Weber & B.L.Burtt
Henckelia monantha (W.T.Wang) D.J.Middleton & Mich.Möller
Henckelia monophylla (C.B.Clarke) D.J.Middleton & Mich.Möller
Henckelia moonii (Gardner) D.J.Middleton & Mich.Möller
Henckelia oblongifolia (Roxb.) D.J.Middleton & Mich.Möller
Henckelia ovalifolia (Wight) A.Weber & B.L.Burtt
Henckelia peduncularis (B.L.Burtt) D.J.Middleton & Mich.Möller
Henckelia primulacea (C.B.Clarke) D.J.Middleton & Mich.Möller
Henckelia puerensis (Y.Y.Qian) D.J.Middleton & Mich.Möller
Henckelia pumila (D.Don) A.Dietr.
Henckelia pycnantha (W.T.Wang) D.J.Middleton & Mich.Möller
Henckelia repens (Bedd.) A.Weber & B.L.Burtt
Henckelia rotundata (Barnett) D.J.Middleton & Mich.Möller
Henckelia shuii (Z.Yu Li) D.J.Middleton & Mich.Möller
Henckelia smitinandii (B.L.Burtt) D.J.Middleton & Mich.Möller
Henckelia speciosa (Kurz) D.J.Middleton & Mich.Möller
Henckelia tibetica (Franch.) D.J.Middleton & Mich.Möller
Henckelia urticifolia (Buch.-Ham. ex D.Don) A.Dietr
Henckelia walkerae (Gardner) D.J.Middleton & Mich.Möller
Henckelia wightii (C.B.Clarke) A.Weber & B.L.Burtt
Henckelia wijesundarae Ranasinghe et al.
Henckelia zeylanica (R.Br.) A.Weber & B.L.Burtt

References

Didymocarpoideae
Gesneriaceae genera